Morocco Mirror was an English-language e-newspaper based in Morocco. It ceased updating in April 2013.

History
Morocco Mirror was established in December 2012 by Bachir Niah and Mustapha May. The online newspaper was launched following the closure of Morocco Times, another English-language e-newspaper. It provided mostly political, economic, social and sports coverage. The editors of Morocco Mirror were those who wrote for Morocco Times. They were mostly based in Casablanca and Agadir.

See also
List of newspapers in Morocco

References

2012 establishments in Morocco
2013 disestablishments in Morocco
Defunct newspapers published in Morocco
English-language newspapers published in Arab countries
English-language websites
Mass media in Casablanca
Middle Eastern news websites
Moroccan news websites
Newspapers established in 2012
Publications disestablished in 2013